Rupprecht Gerngroß (21 June 1915 – 25 February 1996) was a German lawyer and leader of the Freiheitsaktion Bayern or  FAB (English: Bavarian Freedom Action), a group involved in an attempt to overthrow the Nazis in Munich in April 1945.

Biography

Rupprecht Gerngroß was born in Shanghai in 1915, to German parents who both originated from Munich. He returned with his family to Germany after the First World War and was educated in Munich.

He served as a volunteer in the Wehrmacht during the Second World War, was promoted to officer and was wounded. Recovering in a hospital in Poland, he witnessed the execution of a group of Jewish people, an event which turned his opinion against the Nazis.

Upon his return, he was put in charge of an interpreter company in the Bavarian capital. Within this unit he found a group of people who were unconvinced of the Nazi ideals and ideas and he managed to arm his officially unarmed company. From 1942, this company formed the heart of the Freiheitsaktion Bayern, but it also involved a number of civilians. All up, the resistance movement had a strength of about 400 people. Jürgen Wittenstein, a friend of the members of the Weiße Rose, collected weapons for the movement from wounded soldiers at the Italian front, where he had volunteered to serve in order to escape the Gestapo.

During the war, he managed to complete his law degree at the University of Erlangen in 1942.

In the final days of the war, when the order was issued to defend Munich to the last man by blowing up all bridges and using the Munich trams to form barricades, he decided to resist this order to prevent a complete destruction of the infrastructure of the city.

Freiheitsaktion Bayern FAB

In the final days of the Second World War, Gerngroß was serving as a Captain in an interpreter company in Munich. On the morning of 28 April 1945, he ordered the occupation of the radio transmitters in Schwabing-Freimann and Erding and he broadcast messages in multiple languages, encouraging soldiers to resist the Nazi regime. He proclaimed a hunt for the golden pheasants (German:Jagd auf die Goldfasane), this being a popular nickname for NSDAP officials due to the color of their uniforms, and encouraged people to display white flags from their homes as a sign of surrender. His group also occupied the Munich city hall and the headquarters of the Völkischer Beobachter and Münchner Neuesten Nachrichten, two newspapers vital to the Nazi propaganda. The claim that the Freiheitsaktion had taken control over Munich was however premature and led to other uprisings against the Nazis in the region, which were often brutally suppressed by the SS.

Gerngroß's attempt to stop further bloodshed was quickly crushed by the Nazi and SS units still loyal to the collapsing regime. Paul Giesler, Gauleiter of the Gau Munich-Upper Bavaria was personally involved in putting it down. While Gerngroß escaped into the mountains, many others of his movement did not and more than forty were executed hours before the liberation of the city.

While unsuccessful in liberating Munich that day, Gerngroß did save a number of lives through his action. The prisoners of the Dachau concentration camp were supposed to be sent on a death march south with their SS guards to be used as labourers in the Alpenfestung. His broadcast triggered an uprising in Dachau and the SS left in panic, abandoning the inmates who were liberated by the arriving US forces soon thereafter. He is also credited with saving the city of Munich from further destruction, and is therefore considered to be the leader of the only successful putsch against Hitler. His announcement of the end of the Nazis in Munich led many German soldiers to desert the lost cause and the US forces arriving in Munich on 30 April experienced virtually no resistance when taking the city.

In Götting (near Bad Aibling), the teacher Hangl and the priest Grimm decided to hoist the Bavarian flag at the steeple (instead of the swastika flag, called by the priest the "red hanky"; although urged by an officer to remove the flag, they didn't obey. An SS officer later that day arrested both, and they were shot shortly afterwards. On 2 May 1945 the village was liberated by American forces.

Franz Ritter von Epp, Reichskommissar of Bavaria, refused his support to the movement, contributing to its failure to succeed completely. Gerngroß had counted on his support.

After the war 

In 1962, Gerngroß ordered a Chinese Junk in Hong Kong. He took it across the Indian Ocean, sailing to the Mediterranean Sea, where it supposedly was the only one of its kind traveling the Adriatic Sea. He named the boat Mau Yee (German: Münchner Freiheit; English: Munich Freedom). Gerngroß sailed through the Adriatic for another twenty years before eventually returning to Munich, dying there in 1996.

Legacy 

Gerngroß remains almost forgotten within the German resistance movement. In 1946, the Feilitzschplatz in the Munich suburb of Schwabing was renamed Münchner Freiheit (Munich liberty) to commemorate the courageous attempt to free Munich from the Nazis in the last days of the Second World War.

While the Freiheitsaktion Bayern was a failure from a military point of view, it did prevent the further destruction of Munich and sped up the collapse of the Nazi regime in the city. The US occupation authorities acknowledged this fact by recognising the FAB and asking the surviving members to support the Counterintelligence Corps - CIC but the group declined.

Upon her death in 2001, his widow left a substantial amount of documents about the FAB, collected by Gerngroß, to the Bavarian state archives.

Assassination attempts on Hitler 

On two occasions, Gerngroß apparently tried to assassinate Hitler.

Further reading 
 So war das damals 1945 mit der Freiheits Aktion Bayern, FAB (in German) by Rupprecht Gerngross, 1970

References

External links 

 Picture of Rupprecht Gerngross in uniform
 Website of the Junk Mau-Yee (in German)
 Schwabing · Der vergessene Held (in German) Münchner Wochen Anzeiger: Article on the 60th anniversary of the "Freiheitsaktion Bayern"
 BR-Online: Interview with Felix Heidenberger about the Freiheitsaktion Bayern (in German)
 Nuclear age peace foundation - "The White Rose:" Student Resistance in Germany During WWII

1915 births
1996 deaths
History of Munich
German resistance members
German Army officers of World War II
20th-century German lawyers
Jurists from Bavaria
German expatriates in China
People from Shanghai